Relations between France and Syria have a long and complex history. The contemporary relationship largely dates back to the French mandate (1923–1946) over the region established in the midst of the defeat and subsequent Partition of the Ottoman Empire at the end of World War I.

France had an embassy in Damascus (closed down March 2012) and a consulate general in Aleppo and Latakia. Syria has an embassy in Paris and consulates in Marseille and Pointe-à-Pitre.

Despite the historical links between Syria and France, relations have often been strained as a result of the unstable condition of the Middle East's politics and France's foreign policies. France, since August 2011, insists that the Syrian president, Bashar al-Assad, backed by Russia and Iran, must step down, and ever since, France has been backing the Syrian opposition. France was the first Western country to give recognition to the SOC on 13 November 2012.

History

Franco-Syrian War 

Following the Arab Revolt which resulted in the defeat of the Ottomans in Syria, British troops led by General Edmund Allenby, entered the city of Damascus in 1918 accompanied by troops of the Arab Revolt led by Faisal, son of Sharif Hussein of Mecca, and an Arab government was established in Damascus in October 1918. Although the Arabs hoped, trusting earlier British promises, that the newly established state would include all the Arab lands stretching from northern Syria to Yemen, in accordance with the secret Sykes–Picot Agreement between Britain and France, only the interior regions of Syria were given to the Arab kingdom. On 8 October, French troops disembarked in Beirut and occupied the Lebanese coastal region. The French immediately dissolved the local Arab governments in the region, with France demanding full implementation of the Sykes–Picot Agreement, with Syria under its control.

On 14 July 1920, General Henri Gourard gave King Faisal the choice between submission or abdication. Faisal abdicated and fled. However, the  minister of war, Youssef al-Azmeh, refused to comply. With little remaining troops of the Arab army, Bedouin soldiers and civilian volunteers, Azmeh composed an army and met the 12,000 strong French forces under General Mariano Goybet at the Battle of Maysaloun. The French won the battle and Azmeh died on the battlefield along with many of the Syrian troops, with the survivors defecting. Damascus was captured with little local resistance on 24 July 1920.

French Mandate for Syria and the Lebanon 

In 1923, following the Franco-Syrian War France was assigned the League of Nations mandate of Syria and Lebanon, starting from 29 September.

The mandate region was subdivided into six states. The states of Damascus, Aleppo, Alawites, Jabal Druze, the autonomous Sanjak of Alexandretta, and the State of Greater Lebanon. The drawing of those states was based on the sectarian demographics on the ground in Syria and was meant to prevent any unified nationalist revolts. However, nearly all the Syrian sects were hostile to the French mandate and to the division it created.

Great Syrian Revolt 

On August 23, 1925, Druze leader Sultan Pasha al-Atrash officially declared revolution against French rule in Syria. Calling upon unification of all Syrian sects, ethnic communities and religions against French rule, he managed to enlist the aid of large sections of the population in the nationwide revolt which was led by many notable figures from all around Syria such as Hassan al-Kharrat, Nasib al-Bakri, Fawzi al-Qawuqji and Abd al-Rahman Shahbandar.

Although the revolt was initially declared on 23 August, fighting had begun with the Battle of al-Kafr on July 22, 1925, one month before that. Many battles would follow, resulting in rebel victories. France sent thousands of troops to Syria and Lebanon from its African colonies, equipped with modern weapons, compared to the meager supplies of the rebels. The French regained many cities, although fierce resistance against their rule lasted until the spring of 1927, when the revolution was suppressed with the shelling of Damascus. The French sentenced al-Atrash and other national leaders to death, but al-Atrash escaped with the rebels to Transjordan and was eventually pardoned, returning after the signing of the Franco-Syrian Treaty, met with a huge public reception.

Independence 
Although Syria and France had previously negotiated a treaty of independence in September 1936, the treaty never came into force because of the French Legislature's refusal to ratify it. Following the Fall of France in 1940 during World War II, Syria came under the control of Vichy France until the British and Free French occupied the country in the Syria-Lebanon campaign. Pressured from Syrian nationalists and the British forces, France evacuated their troops on 17 April 1946, which marked the creation of the new, independent Syrian republic.

Post-Independence 
Franco-Syrian relations remained well following the independence, marked with a historical background and shared cultural relations.

In June 2000, following the death of Syrian President Hafez al-Assad, French President Jacques Chirac attended his funeral, being the only western head of state to do so. Following the death of Rafiq al-Hariri, which Chirac blamed on Syria, Syria was isolated diplomatically by France.

French president Nicolas Sarkozy worked on pulling Syria out of isolation. He proposed for Syria to join the Union for the Mediterranean, with most EU countries complying and Syria joining the union, with Sarkozy later visiting Damascus and meeting with Syrian President Bashar al-Assad, making him the only western head of state to visit Syria following the assassination of Rafiq Hariri, blamed on Syria by western nations.

On 13 July 2008, Syrian president Bashar al-Assad visited Paris, meeting with President Sarkozy and attending the July 14 parade as a guest of honor.

Syrian Civil War 
Following the outbreak of the Syrian Civil War, France has called for President Bashar al-Assad to step down from power, and has provided opposition forces with non-lethal military aid, including communications equipment and medical supplies following the escalation of the armed conflict in 2012.

In August 2013, when the Syrian government was accused of using chemical weapons in the Ghouta area near Damascus, Paris called for military intervention but was isolated after the US president, Barack Obama, refused to act. Despite France not being involved militarily in the early phases of the conflict, in August 2014 French President François Hollande confirmed that France had delivered arms to Syrian rebels.

After the emergence of ISIL, France began conducting airstrikes against ISIL targets in Syria, and in mid-November 2015, in the wake of the 13 November Paris terror attacks, France, citing self-defence under Article 51 of the United Nations Charter, significantly intensified its air strikes in Syria, closely coordinating with the U.S. military.

Also mid November, France drafted a UN Security Council resolution urging UN members to "take all necessary measures" in the fight against Islamic State and al-Nusra Front.
The following day  the French-drafted resolution was co-sponsored by the UK. 
On 20 November 2015, the UN Security Council unanimously passed the French-British drafted-sponsored resolution.
Also on 20 November, France dismissed Russia's suggestions that the French air strikes against oil installations in Syria were illegal, saying they were "an appropriate and necessary riposte" to attacks by Islamic State.

On 14 April 2018, French President Emmanuel Macron said in a statement that France's "red line has been crossed", in reference to the previous attacks on Douma. Beginning at 04:00 Syrian time (UTC+3), France, the United States, and the United Kingdom carried out a series of military strikes involving aircraft and ship-based missiles against multiple government sites in Syria. They said it was in response to the Douma chemical attack against civilians on 7 April, which they attributed to the Syrian government. The Syrian government denied involvement in the Douma attacks and called the airstrikes a violation of international law. On 20 April, the Syrian government returned the Légion d'honneur award that was given to President Bashar al-Assad by France in 2001, stating that he would not wear the award of a “slave country” to the US. Following the French participation in US led airstrikes on Damascus and Homs and France  "disciplinary procedure" for withdrawing the award.

See also 

Foreign relations of Syria
Foreign relations of France
French Mandate for Syria and the Lebanon

References 

 
Bilateral relations of Syria
Syria
Relations of colonizer and former colony